Naturalization (or naturalisation) is the legal act or process by which a non-citizen of a country may acquire citizenship or nationality of that country. It may be done automatically by a statute, i.e., without any effort on the part of the individual, or it may involve an application or a motion and approval by legal authorities. The rules of naturalization vary from country to country but typically include a promise to obey and uphold that country's laws and taking and subscribing to an oath of allegiance, and may specify other requirements such as a minimum legal residency and adequate knowledge of the national dominant language or culture. To counter multiple citizenship, some countries require that applicants for naturalization renounce any other citizenship that they currently hold, but whether this renunciation actually causes loss of original citizenship, as seen by the host country and by the original country, will depend on the laws of the countries involved.

The massive increase in population flux due to globalization and the sharp increase in the numbers of refugees following World War I created many stateless persons, people who were not citizens of any state. In some rare cases, laws for mass naturalization were passed. As naturalization laws had been designed to cater for the relatively few people who had voluntarily moved from one country to another (expatriates), many western democracies were not ready to naturalize large numbers of people. This included the massive influx of stateless people which followed massive denationalizations and the expulsion of ethnic minorities from newly created nation states in the first part of the 20th century.

Since World War II, the increase in international migrations created a new category of migrants, most of them economic migrants. For economic, political, humanitarian and pragmatic reasons, many states passed laws allowing a person to acquire their citizenship after birth, such as by marriage to a national – jus matrimonii – or by having ancestors who are nationals of that country, in order to reduce the scope of this category. However, in some countries this system still maintains a large part of the immigrant population in an illegal status, albeit with some massive regularizations. Examples include Spain under José Luis Rodríguez Zapatero's government, and Italy under Silvio Berlusconi's government.

Countries without a path to naturalization 

Myanmar and Uruguay are currently the only countries in the world that deny immigrants any path to naturalization. Uruguayan legal citizenship has special characteristics. A person who acquires it retains their nationality of origin, which is determined by Uruguayan law to be that of their country of birth and therefore, is immutable. Legal citizens acquire political rights but do not acquire Uruguayan nationality as natural citizens do. According to Uruguayan law, those born in Uruguay or whose parents or grandparents are Uruguayan natural citizens are considered to be Uruguayan nationals. 

As a result of Uruguay's unusual distinction between citizenship and nationality (it's the only country in the world that recognizes the right to citizenship without being a national), legal citizens have encountered problems with their Uruguayan passports at airports around the world since 2015. This is due to recommendations in the seventh edition of Doc. 9303 of the International Civil Aviation Organization (ICAO), which requires that travel documents issued by participating states include the "Nationality" field. The lack of a naturalization path means that the  Nationality field in legal citizens' passports indicates their country of birth, which Uruguay assumes to be their nationality of origin. Many countries do not accept passports issued by a country that declares the holder to be a national of another country. As a consequence, it has severely curtailed legal citizens' exercise of the right to free movement, as their travel abroad is often difficult or downright impossible.

Due to its current and narrow definition of nationality, Uruguay could be violating the sovereignty of other countries by assigning foreign nationalities in its official documents, thus overriding their powers. Some Uruguayan legal citizens may even, as a result of the application of a national law of a third nation and this Uruguayan interpretation, become de facto stateless.

Summary by country 

The following list is a brief summary of the duration of legal residence before a national of a foreign state, without any cultural, historical, or marriage ties or connections to the state in question, can request citizenship under that state's naturalization laws.

Laws by country

Australia

The Australian Citizenship Act 1973 ended the preferential treatment for British subjects from 1 December 1973. People who became permanent residents from 1 July 2007 must have been lawfully resident in Australia for four years before applying for citizenship by conferral. Those who were present in Australia as permanent residents before 1 July 2007 remain subject to the previous residence requirement (in force since 1984, e.g. resident for 2 years).

People's Republic of China

The People's Republic of China gives citizenship to people with one or two parents with Chinese nationality who have not taken residence in other countries. The country also gives citizenship to people born on its territory to stateless people who have settled there. Furthermore, individuals may apply for nationality if they have a near relative with Chinese nationality, if they have settled in China, or if they present another legitimate reason. In practice, few people gain Chinese citizenship; as of 2010, China had only 1,448 naturalised Chinese in total.

The naturalization process starts with a written application. Applicants must submit three copies, written with a ball-point or fountain pen, to national authorities, and to provincial authorities in the Ministry of Public Security and the Public Security Bureau. Applicants must also submit original copies of a foreign passport, a residence permit, a permanent residence permit, and four two-and-a-half inch long pictures. According to the conditions outlined in the Nationality Law of the People's Republic of China, authorities may also require "any other material that the authority believes are related to the nationality application".

France 

People who fulfil all of the following criteria can obtain French citizenship through naturalisation:

 At least 5 years' residence, although reduced to the following minimum periods in certain situations:
 2 years:
 Successfully completed 2 years of studies with a view to obtaining a degree or diploma at a French higher educational institution;
 Made an exceptional contribution to France's standing and influence in the arts, science, sport, culture, academia, entrepreneurship, etc.
 No minimum residence period:
 Performed military service with the French Army;
 Served voluntarily in wartime in the French Army or an allied army;
 Rendered exceptional service to France (requires personal ministerial approval);
 Attained the official status of a refugee in France;
 Citizen of a member state of the Organisation internationale de la Francophonie and have French as their native language or have completed at least 5 years of schooling in a French-speaking educational establishment.
 Integration into French society, including adhering to the values and principles of the Republic, and having a sufficient knowledge of French history, culture and society;
 Sufficient spoken command of the French language;
 No serious criminal convictions, defined as follows:
 Never been sentenced to more than 6 months' imprisonment (not including suspended sentences) for any crime (unless the applicant has been legally deemed rehabilitated or the sentence has been wiped from their criminal record);
 Never been convicted of any crime that counters France's fundamental interests (unless the applicant has been legally deemed rehabilitated or the sentence has been wiped from their criminal record);
 Never been convicted of any act of terrorism (unless the applicant has been legally deemed rehabilitated or the sentence has been wiped from their criminal record).

The fee for naturalisation is €55, except in French Guiana, where it is €27.50.

Germany 
People who fulfil all of the following criteria can obtain German citizenship through naturalisation:

 At least 8 years' residence in Germany with a valid residence permit. This minimum period is reduced as follows:
 7 years for people who have successfully completed the Integrationskurs;
 3 years for spouses and registered same-sex partners of a German citizen (must have been married or in the registered partnership for at least 2 years at the time of application).
 Declaring allegiance to the German Constitution;
 Sufficient command of the German language;
 No serious criminal convictions.
The dependent minor children of an applicant for naturalisation may also themselves become naturalised German citizens.

The fee for standard naturalisation is €255, while it is €51 per dependent minor child naturalised along with their parent. The fee may be waived in cases of extreme hardship or public interest.

People who naturalise as German citizens must usually give up their previous nationality, as German law takes a restrictive approach to multiple citizenship. Exceptions are made for EU and Swiss citizens (provided that the law of their country of origin does not prohibit the acquisition of another citizenship) and citizens of countries where renouncing one's citizenship is too difficult or humiliating (e.g. Afghanistan), prohibitively expensive (e.g. the United States) or legally impossible (e.g. Argentina).

Grenada 

The Grenadian Government grants citizenship of Grenada for the following reasons:

By Birth
Any person born in Grenada after 1974 or later acquires Grenadian citizenship at birth. The exception is for children born to diplomat parents.
By Descent
Children born outside Grenada to a Grenadian-born parent.
By Registration
Children (over 18) born outside of Grenada to a Grenadian parent.
Children (under 18) born outside of Grenada to a Grenadian parent.
A person who was born outside of Grenada who is a Grandchild of a Grenadian citizen by birth.
A person who is/or has been married to a citizen of Grenada.
 Citizens of Caribbean Countries may apply for citizenship by registration provided that person has been living in Grenada for 4 years and 2 years as a Permanent Resident (within the four-year period) immediately preceding the date of application.
Commonwealth & Irish citizens may apply for citizenship by registration provided that the person has been living in Grenada for 7 years and 2 years as a Permanent Resident (within the seven-year period) immediately preceding the date of application.
By Naturalisation
An Alien or a British Protected Person may apply for citizenship by naturalisation provided that the person has been living in Grenada for 7 years and 2 years as a Permanent Resident (within the seven-year period) immediately preceding the date of application..

India

The Indian citizenship and nationality law and the Constitution of India provides single citizenship for the entire country. The provisions relating to citizenship at the commencement of the Constitution are contained in Articles 5 to 11 in Part II of the Constitution of India. Relevant Indian legislation is the Citizenship Act 1955, which has been amended by the Citizenship (Amendment) Act 1986, the Citizenship (Amendment) Act 1992, the Citizenship (Amendment) Act 2003, and Citizenship (Amendment) Ordinance 2005. The Citizenship (Amendment) Act 2003 received the assent of the President of India on 7 January 2004 and came into force on 3 December 2004. The Citizenship (Amendment) Ordinance 2005 was promulgated by the President of India and came into force on 28 June 2005.

Following these reforms, Indian nationality law largely follows the jus sanguinis (citizenship by right of blood) as opposed to the jus soli (citizenship by right of birth within the territory).

In 2019, a Citizenship Amendment Act was passed by the Parliament of India. This Act aims at fast tracking citizenship for illegal immigrants of  Hindu, Sikh, Buddhist, Jain, Parsi or Christian faiths who have entered India on or before 31 December 2014 from the neighbouring countries of Pakistan, Afghanistan and Bangladesh.

Italy

The Italian Government grants Italian citizenship for the following reasons.

Automatically
Jus sanguinis: for birth;
If an Italian citizen recognizes, at a time after birth, a minor child;
For adoption;
To obtain or re-obtain from a parent.
Following declaration
By descent;
Jus soli: by birth or descent in Italy;
By marriage or naturalization
By marriage: the foreign or stateless spouse of an Italian citizen may acquire Italian citizenship after two years of legal residence in Italy or, if residing abroad, after three years from the date of marriage;
By naturalization: the foreigner can apply for Italian citizenship after ten years of legal residence in Italy, reduced to five years for those who have been recognized as stateless or refugee and four years for citizens of countries of the European Community.

Indonesia

Indonesian nationality is regulated by Law No. 12/2006 (UU No. 12 Tahun 2006). The Indonesian nationality law is based on jus sanguinis and jus soli. The Indonesian nationality law does not recognize dual citizenship except for people under the age of 18 (limited double citizenship principle). After reaching 18 years of age individuals are forced to choose one citizenship (single citizenship principle).

A foreign citizen can apply to become an Indonesian citizen with the following requirements:
 Age 18 or older, or married
 Resided in Indonesia for a minimum of 5 consecutive years or 10 non-consecutive years
 Physically and mentally healthy
 Ability to speak Indonesian and acknowledge Pancasila and Undang-Undang Dasar Negara Republik Indonesia Tahun 1945
 Never convicted of a crime for which the punishment is imprisonment for one year or more
 If having Indonesian citizenship will not give the person dual citizenship
 Employed or have fixed income
 Pay citizenship fee

Any application for citizenship is granted by the President of Indonesia.

Israel
Israel's Declaration of Independence was made on 14 May 1948, the day before the British Mandate was due to expire as a result of the United Nations Partition Plan. The Israeli parliament created two laws regarding immigration, citizenship and naturalization: the Law of Return and the Israeli citizenship law. The Law of Return, enacted on July 15, 1950, gives Jews living anywhere in the world the right to immigrate to Israel. This right to immigrate did not and still does not grant citizenship. In fact, for four years after Israel gained independence, there were no Israeli citizens.

On July 14, 1952, the Israeli parliament enacted the Israeli Nationality Law. The Nationality Law naturalized all citizens of Mandated Palestine, the inhabitants of Israel on July 15, 1952, and those who had legally resided in Israel between May 14, 1948, and July 14, 1952. The law further clarified that naturalization was available to immigrants who had arrived before Israel's creation, immigrants who arrived after statehood was granted, and those who did not come to Israel as immigrants but have since expressed desire to settle in Israel, with restriction. Naturalization applicants must also meet the following requirements: be over 18 years of age, have resided in Israel for three out of the five preceding years, have settled or intend to settle permanently in Israel, have some knowledge of Hebrew, and have renounced prior nationality or demonstrated ability to renounce nationality after becoming a citizen of Israel.

Because of Israel's relatively new and culturally mixed identity, Israel does not grant citizenship to people born on Israeli soil. Instead, the government chose to enact a jus sanguinis system, with the naturalization restrictions listed above. There is currently no legislation on second-generation immigrants (those born in Israel to immigrant parents). Furthermore, foreign spouses can apply for citizenship through the Minister of the Interior, but have a variety of restrictions and are not guaranteed citizenship.

Luxembourg 
People who fulfil all of the following criteria can obtain Luxembourg citizenship through naturalisation:

 At least 18 years old.
 At least 5 years of legal residence in Luxembourg, including an uninterrupted period of one year immediately before applying for citizenship.
 Passing a Luxembourgish language exam.
 Taking a course on "Living together in the Grand Duchy" and passing the associated examination.
 Never having been handed an immediate custodial sentence of 12 months or more or a suspended custodial sentence of 24 months or more, in any country.

Malaysia

Naturalisation in Malaysia is guided by the 1964 Malaysian Constitution. According to the law, those who want to be the country citizen should live in the country for a period of 10–12 years. The would-be-citizens are required to speak the Malay language as well submitting the identity cards of two Malaysians who recommend the applicant for citizenship. As the Government of Malaysia does not recognise dual citizenship, those who seek naturalisation are needed to reside permanently in the country and renouncing their former country citizenship.

The requirements are as follows:
 The applicant shall appear before the Registrar of Citizenship when submitting the application.
 The applicant must be aged 21 years and above on the date of the application.
 The applicant has resided in the federation for a period of not less than 10 years in a period of 12 years, including the 12 months immediately preceding the date of application.
 The applicant intends to reside permanently in the federation.
 The applicant is of good character.
 The applicant has adequate knowledge of the Malay language.
 The applicant must be sponsored by two referees who are citizens aged 21 years and above and who are not relatives, not hired people, and not advocates or solicitors to the applicant.
 Form C must be completed and submitted together with copies of the necessary documents.

The Article 16 of 1957 Malaysian Constitution also stated a similar condition previously.

Philippines

Commonwealth Act No. 473, the Revised Naturalization Law, approved June 17, 1939, provided that people having certain specified qualifications may become a citizen of the Philippines by naturalization. Republic Act No. 9139, approved June 8, 2001, provided that aliens under the age of 18 who were born in the Philippines, who have resided in the Philippines since birth, and who possess other specified qualifications may be granted Philippines citizenship by administrative proceeding subject to certain requirements.

Russia
Naturalization in Russia is guided by articles 13 and 14 of the federal law "About Citizenship of Russian Federation" passed on May 31, 2002. Citizenship of Russia can be obtained in general or simplified order. To become a citizen in general order, one must be 18 years of age or older, continuously live in Russia as a permanent resident for at least five years (this term is limited to one year for valued specialists, political asylum seekers and refugees), have legal means of existence, promise to obey the laws and Constitution of Russia and be fluent in the Russian language.

There is also a possibility to naturalize in a simplified order, in which certain requirements will be waived. Eligible for that are people, at least one parent of whom is a Russian citizen living on Russian territory; people, who lived on the territories of the former Soviet republics but never obtained citizenships of those nations after they gained independence; people, who were born on the territory of RSFSR and formerly held Soviet citizenship; people married to Russian citizens for at least 3 years; people, who served in Russian Armed Forces under contract for at least 3 years; parents of mentally incapacitated children over 18 who are Russian citizens; participants of the State Program for Assisting Compatriots Residing Abroad; and some other categories.

Spain
People who fulfill all of the following criteria can obtain Spanish citizenship through naturalisation 
 At least 10 years' residence in Spain. This period is reduced to 5 years for people who have obtained refugee status; 2 year for nationals of Ibero-American countries, Andorra, the Philippines, Equatorial Guinea, Portugal or persons of Sephardic origin; 1 years for spouses, widows, widowers, people born in Spain or by a Spanish mother or father. 
 Sufficient command of the Spanish language and culture;
 Declaring allegiance to the Spanish Constitution;
 No serious criminal convictions.

People who naturalise as Spanish citizens must usually give up their previous nationality, as Spanish law takes a restrictive approach to multiple citizenship.

South Africa
Chapter 2 of the South African Citizenship Act, enacted on October 6, 1995, defines who is considered a naturalized citizen at the time of the act and also outlines the naturalization process for future immigrants.

Any person who immediately prior to the commencement of the act had been a South African citizen via naturalization, had been deemed to be a South African citizen by registration, or had been a citizen via naturalization of any of the former states now composing South Africa is now considered to be a naturalized citizen of South Africa.

Those wishing to apply for naturalization in the future must apply to the Minister of Home Affairs and must meet a slew of requirements. First, naturalization applicants must be over the age of 18 and must have been a permanent resident of South Africa for five years prior to application (prior to 2010, the permanent residence requirement was one year prior to application and for four out of the eight years prior to application). Applicants must also demonstrate good character and knowledge of the basic responsibilities and privileges of a South African citizen. The ability to communicate in one of the official languages of South Africa is also required. Applicants must show the intention to reside in South Africa after naturalization, and they are required to make a declaration of allegiance. The Constitution of South Africa states that national legislation must provide for the acquisition, loss and restoration of citizenship.

Being a naturalized South African citizen is a privilege, not a right. Even after meeting all the requirements and going through the naturalization process, the minister holds the right to deny citizenship. Foreign spouses of South African citizens can apply for naturalization after two years of marriage, but is subject to potential denial of the minister. The minister can also grant citizenship to minors, if their parent applies for them.

The minister also holds the power to revoke naturalization at any time for specific reasons listed in the Act. Reasons for revoking the naturalization certificate include marrying someone who is a citizen of another country and holding citizenship in another country, or applying for citizenship of another country without prior authorization for retention of citizenship. If a permanent resident is denied naturalization, he or she must wait at least one year before reapplying.

United Kingdom

There has always been a distinction in the law of England and Wales between the subjects of the monarch and aliens: the monarch's subjects owed the monarch allegiance, and included those born in his or her dominions (natural-born subjects) and those who later gave him or her their allegiance (naturalised subjects). Today, the requirements for naturalisation as a citizen of the United Kingdom depend on whether or not one is the spouse or civil partner of a citizen. An applicant who is a spouse or civil partner of a British citizen must:
 hold indefinite leave to remain in the UK (or an equivalent such as Right of Abode or Irish citizenship)
 have lived legally in the UK for three years
 been outside of the UK no more than 90 days during the one-year period prior to filing the application.
 show sufficient knowledge of life in the UK, either by passing the Life in the United Kingdom test or by attending combined English language and citizenship classes. Proof of this must be supplied with one's application for naturalisation. Those aged 65 or over may be able to claim exemption.
 meet specified English, Welsh or Scottish Gaelic language competence standards.

For those not married to or in a civil partnership with a British citizen, the requirements are:
 Five years legal residence in the UK
 Indefinite leave to remain or "equivalent" for this purpose (see above) must have been held for 12 months
 the applicant must intend to continue to live in the UK or work overseas for the UK government or a British corporation or association
 the same "good character" standards apply as for those married to British citizens
 the same language and knowledge of life in the UK standards apply as for those married to British citizens.

United States

Persons who are not US citizens may receive citizenship through the process of naturalization, following the Congressional requirements in the Immigration and Nationality Act (INA). Naturalized citizens have the same rights has those who acquired citizenship at birth.

The INA states the following:

The Naturalization Act of 1795 set the initial rules on naturalization: "free, White persons" who had been resident for five years or more. An 1862 law allowed honorably discharged Army veterans of any war to petition for naturalization after only one year of residence in the United States. An 1894 law extended the same privilege to honorably discharged five-year veterans of the Navy or Marine Corps. Laws enacted in 1919, 1926, 1940, and 1952 continued preferential treatment provisions for veterans.

Following the Spanish–American War in 1898, Philippine citizens were classified as US nationals, and the 1917 Jones–Shafroth Act granted US citizenship to natives of Puerto Rico. But the 1934 Tydings–McDuffie Act reclassified Filipinos as aliens, and set a quota of 50 immigrants per year, and otherwise applying the Immigration Act of 1924 to them.

The Magnuson Act repealed the Chinese Exclusion Act. During the 1940s, 100 annual immigrants from British India and the Philippines were allowed. The War Brides Act of 1945 permitted soldiers to bring back their foreign wives and established precedent in naturalization through marriage. The Immigration Act of 1965 finally allowed people from all nations to be given equal access to immigration and naturalization.

Illegal immigration became a major issue in the United States at the end of the 20th century. The Immigration Reform and Control Act of 1986, while tightening border controls, also provided the opportunity of naturalization for illegal aliens who had been in the country for at least four years. Today, lawful permanent residents of the United States are eligible to apply for US citizenship after five years, unless they continue to be married to a US citizen, in which case they can apply after only three years of permanent residency.

The Child Citizenship Act of 2000 streamlined the naturalization process for children adopted internationally. A child under age 18 who is adopted by at least one US  citizen parent, and is in the custody of the citizen parent(s), is now automatically naturalized once admitted to the United States as an immigrant or when legally adopted in the United States, depending on the visa under which the child was admitted to the United States. The Act also provides that the non-citizen minor child of a newly naturalized US citizen, whether by birth or adoption, also automatically receives US citizenship.

Mass naturalizations 
A few rare mass naturalization processes have been implemented by nation states. In 1891, Brazil granted naturalization to all aliens living in the country. In 1922, Greece massively naturalized all the Greek refugees coming from Turkey. The second massive naturalization process was in favor of Armenian refugees coming from Turkey, who went to Syria, Lebanon or other former Ottoman countries. Reciprocally, Turkey massively naturalized the refugees of Turkish descent or other ethnic backgrounds in Muslim creed from these countries during a redemption process.

Canada instituted a mass naturalization by Act of Parliament with the enactment of the Canadian Citizenship Act 1946.

After annexation of the territories east of the Curzon line by the Soviet Union in 1945, Soviets naturalized en masse all the inhabitants of those territories—including ethnic Poles, as well as its other citizens who had been deported into the Soviet Union, mainly to Kazakhstan. Those people were forcibly naturalized as Soviet citizens. Later on, Germany granted to the ethnic German population in Russia and Kazakhstan full citizenship rights. Poland has a limited repatriation program in place.

The most recent massive naturalization case resulted from the Argentine economic crisis in the beginning of the 21st century. Existing or slightly updated right of return laws in Spain and Italy allowed many of their diasporic descendants to obtain—in many cases to regain—naturalization in virtue of jus sanguinis, as in the Greek case. Hence, many Argentines acquired European nationality.

Since the Fourteenth Amendment to the United States Constitution grants citizenship only to those "born or naturalized in the United States, and subject to the jurisdiction thereof", and the original United States Constitution only grants Congress the power of naturalization, it could be argued that all acts of Congress that expand the right of citizenship are cases of mass naturalization.  This includes the acts that extended U.S. citizenship to citizens of Puerto Rico, the United States Virgin Islands, Guam, and the Northern Mariana Islands, as well as the Indian Citizenship Act of 1924 which made all Native Americans citizens (most of them were previously excluded under the "jurisdiction" clause of the 14th Amendment).

In the eastern Malaysian state of Sabah, mass naturalisation also happened during the administration of United Sabah National Organisation (USNO) and Sabah People's United Front (BERJAYA's) Muslim-dominated political parties to increase the Muslim population in the territory by naturalising immigrants and refugees from the mainly-Muslim dominated areas of Mindanao and Sulu Archipelago of the Philippines and Sulawesi of Indonesia.

In occupied territories 
The mass naturalization of native people in occupied territories is illegal under the laws of war (Hague and Geneva Conventions).  However, there have been many instances of such illegal mass naturalizations in the 20th century.

See also 
 Citizenship
 Permanent residency
 History of citizenship
 European Convention on Nationality
 Convention on the Reduction of Statelessness

Notes

References

External links 

PoliticosLatinos.com Videos of 2008 US Presidential Election Candidates' Positions regarding Immigration
Naturalization First Appeared in the Constitution
EUDO CITIZENSHIP Observatory

Acquired citizenship
Philosophy of law
Time in government